Sandra Alonso Domínguez (born 19 August 1998) is a Spanish racing cyclist, who currently rides for UCI Women's Continental Team .

Major results

2015
 3rd Road race, National Junior Road Championships
2016
 1st Torneo Euskadun junior
 2nd Larrabasterra, Sopela
 5th Vuelta a Valencia
 8th Road race, UCI World Junior Road Championships
2017
 4th Gran Premio comunidad de Cantabria / Trofeo villa de Noja
 5th Larrabasterra, Sopela
2018
 2nd Copa Espana
 2nd Gran Premio comunidad de Cantabria / Trofeo villa de Noja
 3rd Trofeo Ayto de Egües, Elcano
 4th Trofeo ciudad de Caspe, Zaragoza
 5th Gran Premio La Burundesa Sari Nagusia, Sarriguren
2019
 1st Trofeo Gobierno de la Rioja, Entrena
 2nd Gran Premio comunidad de Cantabria / Trofeo villa de Noja
 2nd Estella, Lizarra
 3rd Ciudad de Dos Hermanas, Sevilla
 4th Trofeo Ayto de Egües, Elcano
 9th Time trial, National Under–23 Road Championships
2020
 1st Campeonato de Euskadi en Segura, Guipúzcoa
 1st Premio Ayto Sopelana
 1st Karmen Saria, Txirrindulariak
 1st Challenge Murcia / Circuito Carthagena 
 1st stage 1 Challenge Murcia / Circuito Carthagena 
 3rd stage 2 Challenge Murcia / Circuito Carthagena 
 6th Time trial, National Road Championships
2021
 1st Stage 2 Setmana Ciclista Valenciana
 1st Classica de l'Arros / Sueca
 2nd Barrundia Udalaren Saria
 5th Stage 2 Vuelta a Burgos Feminas
 6th Vuelta a la Comunitat Valenciana Feminas
 8th Scheldeprijs
2022
 3rd  Road race, Mediterranean Games
 5th Vuelta a la Comunitat Valenciana Feminas
 10th Paris–Roubaix
 10th Ronde de Mouscron 
 3th Time trial, National Road Championships
 2nd Road Race, National Road Championships

Track results

Spain national championships
2017
 1st National Track Championships, individual pursuit
2018
 2nd National Track Championships, individual pursuit
2019
 1st National Track Championships, individual pursuit
 3rd National Track Championships, points race
 3rd National Track Championships, 500 m
 3rd National Track Championships, Madison

References

External links

1998 births
Living people
Spanish female cyclists
Mexican female cyclists
Cyclists from the Valencian Community
People from Vega Baja del Segura
Sportspeople from the Province of Alicante
20th-century Spanish women
21st-century Spanish women
Mediterranean Games bronze medalists for Spain
Competitors at the 2022 Mediterranean Games